Kalyan (Pronunciation: [kəljaːɳ]) is a city on the banks of Ulhas River in Thane district of Maharashtra state in Konkan division. It is governed by Kalyan-Dombivli Municipal Corporation. Kalyan is a subdivision (Taluka) of Thane district. Kalyan and its neighbouring township of Dombivli jointly form Kalyan-Dombivli Municipal Corporation, abbreviated as KDMC. It is a founding city of the Mumbai Metropolitan Region. Kalyan is the 7th biggest city in Maharashtra and 29th in India. Kalyan also serves as a major railway station for the trains bound to Mumbai and is a large junction separating two routes, one going Karjat and other Kasara.

Etymology

The name 'Kalyan' is believed to be from Kalyan Swami, a great disciple of Sadguru Samartha Ramdas Swami who arrived at Durga Devi Temple on Fort Durgadi, which was won by Shri Chhatrapati Shivaji Maharaj. In Colonial India, the British Raj referred this city as Kallian, Cullian, or Calliannee.

Around Kalyan

Durgadi Fort

The city of Kalyan was surrounded by a fort wall, the construction of which began during Shah Jahan's reign and was completed during Aurangzeb's reign in 1694 A.D. This city wall, which ran in excess of 2000 yards, 2123 to be precise, was guarded by 4 gates and 11 towers. The fort wall enclosed an area of 70 acres and on a high mound near the Kalyan creek, where the current Ganesh ghat stands, was a fine fort since as early as 1570.

The wall of the fort along the top of the inner bank of the ditch, and, near the north end, had a gateway known as the Delhi or Killyacha Darwaja. 

In the citadel of the fort Marathas built a small wooden temple of Durgadevi behind the mosque, and called the fort Durgadi Killain in honor of the goddess, a name which it still bears. The fort measures  in length and somewhat less in breadth. Under the English rule, the fort wall was dismantled and stones carried away to build the Kalyan and Thane piers and a dwelling for the customs inspector in the west of the Kalyan fort. The gate to the north-west is almost the only trace of the fort wall, which is of rough stone masonry. During 1876 the original idol of the goddess Durga was stolen.

Demographics
The majority of Kalyan citizens are Hindus with Muslims being a minority..

Climate

Transport 
Trains, Buses and Auto-rickshaws are the important mode of transport in and around Kalyan. 200,000 Kalyan citizens travel daily by local trains.

Kalyan Junction railway station is on the railway line between Mumbai and Karjat/Kasara. The city of Kalyan has access to four railway stations on the Central line - Thakurli Station, Vitthalwadi, Shahad Station and Kalyan Junction. Kalyan Junction serves as an important railway station for the people in and around Mumbai.

One of the oldest and important railway project of Ahmednagar railway station was kalyan-Ahmednagar railway project which was in planning stage since british regime. It was referred  as 3rd ghat project. The survey of this project was carried out in 1973,2000, 2006, 2014 etc. This project was in pink book in 2010. unfortunately this project could not be started. The alignment length of thus project was 184 km and it could have been shortest route for marathwada, andhra and telangana. The major challenge for this project was 18.96 km long tunnel in malshej ghat section. 

Malshej Kriti samiti is following for kalyan ahmednagar railway project. Kalyan-murbad section which is first phase of this project is already under survey stage.

Civic amenities

With a population of more than 700,000, Kalyan is a part of the Kalyan-Dombivli Municipal Corporation established in 1983, with municipalities of Kalyan, Dombivli, Ambernath and 81 other villages. The government of Maharashtra has decided to delete major area of the corporation limits on different occasions.

Government
KDMC is a municipal corporation in Thane district of Maharashtra State, India. The municipal corporation was formed in 1983 to administer the twin townships of Kalyan and Dombivli. The municipal corporation has a population 15,18,762 citizens as per the 2011 census.
Due to its highly educated population it is often called the second cultural capital of Maharashtra after Pune. Kalyan was once famous as a port in ancient times. Records of its existence as a premier port in the region have been found in ancient Greek manuscripts.

The corporation is governed by Bombay Provincial Municipal Corporation Act 1949. The following authorities are given charge to implement the provisions of the act:
 A corporation
 A standing committee
 Ward committees
 Municipal commissioner

Both the cities are divided into 122 wards. Municipal Corporation consists of Councillors elected directly at Ward Elections. The number and boundaries of the Wards into which the city is divided is specified by the State Election Commissioner.
There are five Councillors nominated by the corporation. 
As per the provisions of the Act, the total number of Councillors is 121.
The Corporation elects one of its members as the Mayor and another to be the Deputy Mayor.

Schools and colleges

Birla College of Arts, Science & Commerce
Mar Thoma Special School for Children in Need of Special Care
Sri Vani Vidyashala High School

Gallery

Notable people 
 
 
 Vishwanath Bhoir  MLA, (Kalyan West)
 Tushar Deshpande  Indian cricketer. (Fast bowler)
 Pranav Dhanawade  Indian cricketer. (Record holder for most runs 1009*)
 Ganpat Gaikwad  MLA, BJP (Kalyan East)
 Anandi Gopal Joshi  first Indian female physician
 Gavin Packard  Indian actor
 Pramod Ratan Patil  MLA, MNS (Kalyan Rural)
 Narendra Pawar  Ex-MLA, BJP (Kalyan West)
 Lalit Prabhakar  Indian actor
 Shrikant Shinde  Member of Parliament (Kalyan)

References

External links
 KDMC: Kalyan Dombivli Municipal Corporation

Cities and towns in Thane district
Talukas in Maharashtra
Kalyan-Dombivli